("Litany to the Black Virgin"), FP 82, is a piece of sacred music composed by Francis Poulenc in 1936 for a three-part choir of women (or children) and organ, setting a French litany recited at the pilgrimage site Rocamadour which the composer visited. The subtitle, Notre-Dame de Rocamadour, refers to the venerated black sculpture of Mary. The composition is Poulenc's first piece of sacred music. In 1947 he wrote a version for voices accompanied by string orchestra and timpani.

History 
Poulenc returned to the Catholic faith of his youth in 1936 and began to compose sacred music with this piece. He made a pilgrimage to the shrine of the Black Virgin of Rocamadour shortly after learning of the death of his friend, the composer Pierre-Octave Ferroud, in a car accident. His account of the pilgrimage reads:

The piece was published by Durand & Cie in Paris in 1937.

Text and music 
Poulenc heard the French text of the litany, beginning with the line "Seigneur, ayez pitié de nous" (Lord, have mercy on us), during his pilgrimage. It is a prayer for mercy, addressing the persons of the Trinity, and for intercession from Mary of Rocamadour, who is named Virgin, Queen and Our Lady, for example "Vierge à qui Zachée ou Saint Amadour éleva ce sanctuaire, priez pour nous." (Virgin, to whom Zacchaeus or Saint Amadour constructed this shrine, pray for us.), "Reine, dont la main délivrait les captifs, priez pour nous." (Queen, whose hand delivered the captives, pray for us.) and "Notre Dame, dont le pélerinage est enrichi de faveurs spéciales ... priez pour nous." (Our Lady, whose pilgrimage is blessed with special favours ... pray for us.).
 
Poulenc scored the litany for a three-part choir of women's voices or children's voices with organ accompaniment. The work is modal in the style of chant, avoiding conventional cadences. The organ adds several "dramatic dissonances".

In 1947 Poulenc expanded the instrumentation to string orchestra and timpani.

References

Bibliography

External links 
 

Compositions by Francis Poulenc
1936 compositions
Choral compositions